Wrigley Field was a ballpark in Los Angeles, California. It hosted minor league baseball teams in the region for more than 30 years. It was the home park for the minor league Los Angeles Angels during their run in the Pacific Coast League, as well as for the inaugural season of the major league team of the same name in 1961. The park was designed by Zachary Taylor Davis, who had previously designed both Chicago ballparks: Comiskey Park and Wrigley Field. The ballpark was also used as the backdrop for several Hollywood films about baseball, as well as the 1960 TV series Home Run Derby.

History
Called Wrigley's "Million Dollar Palace", Wrigley Field was built in South Los Angeles in 1925, and was named after William Wrigley Jr., the chewing gum magnate. Wrigley owned the first tenants, the original Los Angeles Angels, a Pacific Coast League team, and their parent club the Chicago Cubs. In 1925, the Angels moved from their former home at Washington Park, which was also known as Chutes Park. Wrigley's Major League home (Wrigley Field) on the north side of Chicago was named for him later, in 1926.

Wrigley Field in Los Angeles was built to resemble Spanish-style architecture and a somewhat scaled-down version of the Chicago ballpark (known then as Cubs Park) as it looked at the time. It was also the first of the two ballparks to bear Wrigley's name, as the Chicago park was named for Wrigley over a year after the L.A. park's opening. At the time, he owned Santa Catalina Island, and the Cubs conducted spring training in that island's city of Avalon (whose ball field was located on Avalon Canyon Road and also informally known as "Wrigley Field").

The boundary street in right field (east) was Avalon Boulevard, with a small parking lot. The other boundaries of the block were 41st Place (north, left field), 42nd Place (south, first base line), and San Pedro Street (west, third base line and a larger parking lot). Not only did L.A. Wrigley get its name first, it had more on-site parking than the Chicago version did (or does now).

Lights were added to the park in 1930. Chicago's Wrigley Field did not get lights until 1988, when night games were added to the Cubs' home schedule for the first time.

Baseball

Dimensions

The ballpark's dimensions were cozy but symmetrical, giving a nearly equal chance to right and left-handed batters in the Home Run Derby series. The only difference was that the height of the left field wall was 14.5 feet, whereas the right field fence was only nine feet high.

Minor League Baseball 1925–1957

For 33 seasons, 1925 to 1957, the park was home to the Angels, who were a farm team of the Chicago Cubs. For 11 seasons, (1926–1935, 1938) the park was also the home of another PCL team, the Hollywood Stars. In 1930, the Angels and Stars combined to draw over 850,000 fans, more than the two major league teams in St. Louis (Browns and Cardinals) drew that season. The Stars eventually moved to their own new ballpark, Gilmore Field, just west of the Pan Pacific Auditorium. Angel players of note included future Dodgers Manager and Hall of Fame member Tommy Lasorda, future Phillies, Expos, Twins and Angels Manager Gene Mauch, actor Chuck Connors, Gene Baker, and Andy Pafko. The parent club, Chicago Cubs were the first major league team to play at Wrigley, when they played the Angels in a spring training game in 1926. Years later, on March 20, 1949, the major league Cubs played the defending world champion Cleveland Indians in a spring training game before 24,517.

On February 21, 1957, the Dodgers bought Wrigley Field, the Angels franchise and their territorial rights for $3 million (as well as a team in Fort Worth, Texas). L.A. Wrigley's minor league baseball days then ended when the Brooklyn Dodgers of the National League transferred to Los Angeles in 1958. The Pacific Coast League Angels franchise were forced to relocate, ending up in Spokane, Washington, as the Indians, with a brand-new stadium.

The use of Wrigley, and enlarging it was studied by the Dodgers, as well as the Rose Bowl in Pasadena and the Los Angeles Coliseum.  The Dodgers opted for seating capacity over suitability as a baseball field, and instead set up shop for four seasons in the 93,000-seat L.A. Coliseum (which had a  foul line in left field) while awaiting construction of the baseball-only Dodger Stadium, which has a set capacity of 56,000. The decision to play at the Coliseum was vindicated when the Dodgers won the 1959 World Series over the Chicago White Sox, with all three games played at the Coliseum attracting over 92,000 fans including the World Series single game attendance record of 92,706 for game 5 of the series.

Major League Baseball: Los Angeles Angels

In October 1960, Major League Baseball added two teams, expanding the American League from 8 to 10 teams. Teams were awarded to Los Angeles and Washington, D.C. (with the latter team a replacement for the one that had relocated to Minneapolis–Saint Paul at the same time). The L.A. franchise was awarded to Gene Autry and Bob Reynolds, and was again called the Los Angeles Angels. In 1961, the major league Angels began play and, by agreement, took residence at Wrigley for its inaugural season.

The agreement had been criticized, with the Dodgers playing the 1961 season at the nearby Coliseum. Wrigley Field had been considered an "abandoned minor league stadium" in a "declining neighborhood" with "terrible parking."

The home opener on April 27 was a 4–2 loss to the Minnesota Twins before a crowd of only 11,931. Vice President Richard Nixon and Casey Stengel were in attendance, along with Ford Frick, Joe Cronin, and Ty Cobb.

The last major league game at Wrigley was on October 1, 1961, and Cleveland beat the Angels  before 9,868 fans. Steve Bilko hit the last home run in Wrigley.

The Angels set a still-standing first-season expansion-team record with 71 wins finishing . Thanks to its cozy power alleys, the park became the setting for a real-life version of Home Run Derby, setting another record by yielding 248 home runs; that 248 mark stood for over 30 years.

The 1961 Angels were led in hitting by Lee Thomas with a .284 batting average; in home runs by Leon Wagner with 28, and runs batted in by Ken Hunt with 84. The pitching staff was led by Ken McBride with 12 wins. Future World Series winning manager Chuck Tanner played in 7 games. The team drew 603,510 fans.

In 1962, the Angels moved to the new Dodger Stadium (or "Chavez Ravine", as it was known for Angels games) for four seasons until Anaheim Stadium opened in 1966, when the team was also rebranded as the California Angels. The new Dodger Stadium also "took over" for Wrigley Field, as the site of choice for Hollywood filming that required a ballpark setting.

Professional boxing
Wrigley was used frequently for boxing. Six world title boxing bouts were held there, including the 1939 Joe Louis-Jack Roper fight. Sugar Ray Robinson also boxed at Wrigley Field. Robinson won the Middleweight Championship on May 18, 1956, knocking out Carl Olson before 18,000 fans. On August 18, 1958, in a Heavyweight Championship fight, Floyd Patterson defeated Roy Harris with 17,000 in attendance.

Football

1938 NFL Pro-Bowl
Several weeks after the completion of the  season, the first NFL Pro Bowl was held at Wrigley Field on January 15, 1939. Sammy Baugh was among those on the rosters that matched the champion New York Giants against All-Star NFL players.

Pepperdine University
The Pepperdine Waves college football team played home games at Wrigley Field in 1948.

Soccer
On May 28, 1959, the park hosted a soccer friendly match between England and the United States; England won  in front of 13,000.
On June 1, 1960, Scottish Champions Hearts defeated England's Manchester United 4-0 in front of a crowd of 11,000.  The U.S. Men's National Team played a World Cup Qualifier against Mexico on November 6, 1960, drawing 3–3 before 9,500 people.

Movies and television filming
Being closer to Hollywood than the other major league baseball fields at the dawn of motion pictures, Wrigley Field was a popular place to film baseball movies. The first film known to have used Wrigley as a shooting location was 1927's Babe Comes Home, a silent film starring Babe Ruth. Some well-known movies filmed there were The Pride of the Yankees (1942) and the Damn Yankees (1958). When Frank Capra filmed the public rally scene at Wrigley for Meet John Doe in August 1940, massive sprinklers simulated a downpour because the director included one rainy scene in each movie as good luck. The film noir classic Armored Car Robbery (1950) had its title heist set at Wrigley.

The ballpark later found its way into television, serving as the backdrop for the Home Run Derby series in 1960, a popular show filmed in 1959 which featured one-on-one contests between baseball's top home run hitters, which had a revival in 1989 when it aired on ESPN, and later on ESPN Classic. Episodes of shows as diverse as The Twilight Zone ("The Mighty Casey", 1960), Mannix ("To Catch a Rabbit", 1969) were also filmed there. Some closeups were filmed there for insertion into the 1951 film Angels in the Outfield, a film otherwise set at Forbes Field in Pittsburgh.  A 1932 movie short starring Babe Ruth, titled Just Pals, was also filmed at Wrigley Field.

Jazz concerts 
Leon Hefflin, Sr. produced the first largest outdoor jazz entertainment event of its kind, the Cavalcade of Jazz, held at Wrigley as part of the Central Avenue jazz scene and showcased over 125 artists from 1945 to 1956. The Cavalcade of Jazz concerts were the stepping stone to success for such stars as Toni Harper, Dinah Washington, Roy Milton, Frankie Lane and others. He also hosted a beauty contest at the events. His first COJ show starred Count Basie & His Orchestra, Joe Liggins & His Honeydrippers, Valaida Snow, Big Joe Turner, the Peters Sisters, Slim & Bam (Slim Gaillard and Bam Brown), and more artists on September 23, 1945 with a crowd of 15,000.

Demolition
Following the Angels' departure after the 1961 season, Wrigley Field had no regular tenants. By then the park was owned by the city, and various events were staged. On May 26, 1963, a large crowd attended a civil rights rally featuring Martin Luther King Jr. By 1966 the park was being used for soccer matches.

In October 1968, the ballpark was renamed Gilbert Lindsay Community Center as a first step in renovating the site. Demolition was underway by January 1969.  The resulting city park has a ball field in the northwest corner of the property, which was once a parking area. The diamond is locally known as "Wrigley Field", and is the home of Wrigley Little League baseball and softball. The original site of the Wrigley diamond and grandstand is occupied by the Kedren Community Mental Health Center and another parking lot.

References
Notes

Bibliography
Benson, Michael (1989) Ballparks of North America: A Comprehensive Historical Reference to Baseball Grounds, Yards and Stadiums, 1845 to Present. Jefferson, North Carolina: McFarland Publishing 
Lowry, Philip J. (1992) Green Cathedrals: The Ultimate Celebration of All 271 Major League and Negro League Ballparks Past and Present. Boston: Addison-Wesley 
Ritter, Lawrence (1992) Lost Ballparks: A Celebration of Baseball's Legendary Fields. New York: Avery Publishing.

External links
 Society for American Baseball Research – Wrigley Field (Los Angeles)
 Sanborn map showing Wrigley Field, 1953

American football venues in Los Angeles
Baseball venues in Los Angeles
Boxing venues in Los Angeles
Defunct college football venues
Los Angeles Angels stadiums
Los Angeles Angels (PCL) stadiums
Defunct baseball venues in the United States
Defunct Major League Baseball venues
Defunct minor league baseball venues
Demolished sports venues in California
History of Los Angeles
National Football League venues in Los Angeles
Loyola Lions football
Pepperdine Waves football
Soccer venues in Los Angeles
Towers in California
Wrigley Company
South Los Angeles
Demolished buildings and structures in Los Angeles
1965 disestablishments in California
1925 establishments in California
Sports venues completed in 1925
Sports venues demolished in 1969